Laura Joh Rowland is an American detective/mystery author best known for her series of historical mystery novels featuring protagonist   set in feudal Japan, mostly in Edo during the late 17th century.  She is also the author of two other historical  mystery series, one featuring a fictionalized Charlotte Brontë, as well an ongoing series set in Victorian England around the time of the Jack the Ripper murders.

Rowland is the daughter of Chinese American and Korean American immigrants. She grew up in Michigan and was educated at the University of Michigan, where she graduated with a B.S. in Microbiology and a Masters in Public health. She lived in New Orleans, Louisiana until Hurricane Katrina nearly destroyed her house, but now lives in New York City.

Sano Ichirō
The novels deal with the experiences of Sano Ichirō, a samurai and minor official who, by the end of the first novel, became the trusted chief investigator for the fifth Tokugawa shōgun, Tokugawa Tsunayoshi, and by the tenth novel, was promoted to a very high office.

Throughout the stories, Sano constantly had to deal with his problems following the code of bushido while serving both justice and his master, the Shogun; and with his wife, who frequently involves herself in Sano's investigations. Sano experiences great pressure as he is faced with death if he does not fulfill his obligations to the shōgun as well.

Rowland takes some literary license with known figures, creating fictionalized versions of Tokugawa Tsunayoshi, Emperor Higashiyama in The Samurai's Wife, and Yanagisawa Yoshiyasu.  Objective historical details, however, are credibly accurate.

List of Sano Ichirō novels
 Shinjū (1994, Random House)
 Bundori (1996, HarperTorch)
 The Way of the Traitor (1997, Headline Feature)
 The Concubine's Tattoo (December 1998, St. Martin's Press)
 The Samurai's Wife (May 2000, St. Martin's Press)
 Black Lotus (April 2001, St. Martin's Press)
 The Pillow Book of Lady Wisteria (April 2002, St. Martin's Press)
 The Dragon King's Palace (April 2003, St. Martin's Press)
 The Perfumed Sleeve (April 2004, St. Martin's Minotaur)
 The Assassin's Touch (August 2005, St. Martin's Press)
 The Red Chrysanthemum (November 2006, St. Martin's Press)
 The Snow Empress (October 30, 2007, St. Martin's Minotaur)
 The Fire Kimono (November 11, 2008, St. Martin's Minotaur)
 The Cloud Pavilion (October 27, 2009, Minotaur Books)
 The Ronin's Mistress (September 13, 2011, Minotaur Books)
 The Incense Game (September 18, 2012, Minotaur Books)
 The Shogun's Daughter (September 17, 2013, St. Martin's Press)
 The Iris Fan (December 9, 2014, St. Martin's Press)

Annotations
 It is not known if it is intentional that the protagonist's name Sano Ichirō could be interpreted as a homage to one of Japan's most famous deductive fiction writers, born in 1928, who uses the pen-name of Sano Yo (佐野洋).
 The title of the first novel is the Romanized form of the term written in kanji as 心中, pronounced as Shinjū, which refers to a suicide pact by a pair of lovers.
 The title of the second novel is the Romanized form of the term written in katakana as ブンドリ (bu-n-do-ri), which means "seizing the soil of the vanquished", or simply spoils of war or war trophy.

Other novels

Charlotte Brontë mysteries
 The Secret Adventures of Charlotte Brontë. Overlook Press; 2008. 
 Bedlam: The Further Secret Adventures of Charlotte Brontë. Overlook Press; 2010.

A Victorian Mystery
 The Ripper's Shadow: A Victorian Mystery.  Crooked Lane Books; 2017.  
 A Mortal Likeness: A Victorian Mystery. Crooked Lane Books; 2018. 
 The Hangman's Secret: A Victorian Mystery. Crooked Lane Books; 2019. 
 The Woman in the Veil: A Victorian Mystery. Crooked Lane Books; 2020. 
 Portrait of Peril: A Victorian Mystery. Crooked Lane Books; 2021. 
 Garden of Sin: A Victorian Mystery. Crooked Lane Books; 2022.

References

External links
 Laura Joh Rowland's Official Web Site
  The Sano Ichirō Page

American mystery writers
American historical novelists
Writers of historical mysteries
Living people
University of Michigan College of Literature, Science, and the Arts alumni
American writers of Chinese descent
American writers of Korean descent
American women novelists
20th-century American novelists
21st-century American novelists
20th-century American women writers
21st-century American women writers
Novelists from Michigan
Women mystery writers
Women historical novelists
American women writers of Chinese descent
Year of birth missing (living people)
University of Michigan School of Public Health alumni
Writers of historical fiction set in the early modern period